The 2015 season was the San Diego Chargers' 46th in the National Football League, their 56th overall and their third under head coach Mike McCoy. The team had its worst season since 2003 with a 4–12 record.

Offseason

Signings

Departures

Draft

|-
| 4
| colspan=7 align=center| None – see draft trades below
|-

|-
| 7
| colspan=7 align=center| None – see draft trades below
|-

Notes
 The Chargers traded their fourth-round selection (No. 117 overall) and 2016 fifth-round selection to the San Francisco 49ers to move up in the first round to select Melvin Gordon.
 The Chargers traded their seventh-round selection (No. 236 overall) to the Dallas Cowboys in exchange for defensive tackle Sean Lissemore.

Staff

Final roster

Schedule

Preseason

Regular season

Note: Intra-division opponents are in bold text.

Game summaries

Week 1: vs. Detroit Lions

The Chargers started their season at home against the Lions.  After falling behind 21-10 at halftime, the Bolts managed to outscore the Lions 23-7 in the second half of the game and win it 33-28.

With the win, the Chargers started their season 1-0 and improved to 5-0 all-time at home against Detroit.

Week 2: at Cincinnati Bengals
The Chargers would trail all game, and tried to come back towards the end of the game, but Philip Rivers threw an interception, sealing the game. With the loss, the Chargers fell to 1-1.

Week 3: at Minnesota Vikings
The Chargers once again would never lead during the game. The game was officially sealed when Chad Greenway returned an interception 91 yards down the sidelines for a touchdown. Adrian Peterson would rush for 126 yards on 20 attempts, including a 43-yard touchdown early in the third quarter on a play in which he ran through Charger defenders. With the loss, the Chargers fell to 1-2.

Week 4: vs. Cleveland Browns
The Browns would go down to tie the game with a touchdown and a 2-point conversion. The Chargers would then get into field goal range for kicker Josh Lambo. Lambo attempted a 39-yard attempt, but the kick was no good, and the game appeared to be heading to overtime. However, the Browns were flagged for being offsides, as Tramon Williams jumped before the ball was snapped. The penalty gave Lambo a chance at redemption. This time, Lambo drilled the game-winning 34-yard field goal to give the Chargers the win. With the win, the Chargers improved to 2-2.

Week 5: vs. Pittsburgh Steelers
The Chargers took the lead after Josh Lambo made a 54-yard field goal with 2:56 remaining in the game. However, the Steelers, lead by Michael Vick, were able to march all the way down the field to score as time expired. The final play came on a wildcat formation call, as running back Le'Veon Bell took the direct snap and rushed in for the game winner as the clock expired. The play was reviewed, and the call stood, giving Pittsburgh the win. This game is also notable for the number of Steeler fans that showed up to the game. According to the attendance, there were over 1,000 Steeler fans in the crowd during this game, and whenever the Steelers would score, terrible towels would be waved all over the place, as if the game was being held at Heinz Field. With the loss, the Chargers fell to 2-3.

Week 6: at Green Bay Packers

The Chargers travel to Lambeau Field to take on Aaron Rodgers and the red-hot Green Bay Packers. However, despite a big day from Philip Rivers throwing for 503 yards, it wasn't enough to stun the Packers in Lambeau and they would go on to lose, 27-20.

With the close loss, the Chargers drop to 2-4.

Week 7: vs. Oakland Raiders
The Chargers would trail as much as 37-6 for most of the game. The Chargers would try to come back, and outscored Oakland 23-0 in the fourth quarter. However, it was not enough, as the Chargers lost 37-29. With the loss, the Chargers fell to 2-5.

Week 8: at Baltimore Ravens
The 1-6 Ravens took down the Chargers after Justin Tucker nailed the game winning 39-yard field goal as time expired. With the loss, the Chargers fell to 2-6.

Week 9: vs. Chicago Bears
For the second time this season, the Chargers home opponent's fans seemed to outnumber their own fans, as Bears fans were heard for most of the game. The Chargers would lead for most of the game. However, the Bears would go down to take the lead on a Zach Miller touchdown. Miller had to go airborne and made the catch with one hand. The grab would seal the win for the Bears. With the loss, the Chargers fell to 2-7.

Week 11: vs. Kansas City Chiefs
This game was originally going to be on Sunday Night Football, but was later changed to 4:25 after the Bengals-Cardinals game was flexed to Sunday Night. The Chiefs rattled the Chargers 33-3, and it was the first time the Chargers failed to score a touchdown since 2012 against the Falcons. With the loss, the Chargers fell to 2-8.

Week 12: at Jacksonville Jaguars
The Chargers were able to hold off a comeback by the Jaguars in the fourth quarter, and the Chargers got their first road win of the season. With the win, San Diego went to 3-8.

Week 13: vs. Denver Broncos
For the second time in 3 weeks, the Chargers would fail to score a touchdown, as they were only held to 3 points against a powerful Broncos defense. With the loss, the Chargers fell to 3-9.

Week 14: at Kansas City Chiefs
For the second time this season against the Chiefs, the Chargers did not score a touchdown. This game, however, was a lot closer, as the Chargers lost by a mere 7 points. With the loss, the Chargers fell to 3-10. They were outscored in the season series with Kansas City 43-6.

Week 15: vs. Miami Dolphins

The Chargers easily dominated the Dolphins, 30-14, to go to 4-10 in what some thought could've been the last game the Chargers played in San Diego.

Week 16: at Oakland Raiders
The Chargers would tie the game after Josh Lambo converted a 45-yard field goal attempt with 55 seconds remaining in regulation. In overtime, the Raiders would kick the go-ahead field goal on their first possession. The Chargers tried to go down the field to tie or win, but the comeback failed, and the Raiders held on for the win. With the loss, the Chargers fell to 4-11 and were swept by the Raiders for the first time since 2010.

Week 17: at Denver Broncos
The Chargers went to Denver to try and prevent the Broncos from clinching home-field advantage throughout the AFC Playoffs. Despite forcing 5 turnovers, the Chargers failed to convert them into points, as their offense struggled all afternoon. Brock Osweiler would later be benched, and Peyton Manning would enter the game for Denver. The Chargers would have the lead twice in this game, but lost them both. The game was officially put away after Ronnie Hillman ran for 23 yards for a touchdown to put the Broncos ahead for good. With the loss, the Chargers ended their season at 4-12, and also finished 0-6 against their division.

Standings

Division

Conference

References

External links
 

San Diego
San Diego Chargers seasons
San Diego Chargers